Salvatore Rispoli (Naples, 1739 - 1812) was an Italian opera composer.

Work
Works by Salvatore Rispoli:
 Il trionfo de' pupilli oppressi, 1782
 Nitteti, 1782
 Ipermestra, 1795
 Idalide, 1786
 Il trionfo di Davide, 1787

References

1739 births
1812 deaths
Italian opera composers
18th-century Neapolitan people